Sivan in Iran may refer to:
 Sivan, East Azerbaijan
 Sivan, Marand, East Azerbaijan Province
 Sivan, Fars
 Sivan, West Azerbaijan